Dendrobium finniganense, commonly known as the Mount Finnigan cane orchid, is a species of terrestrial or lithophytic orchid endemic to a few mountain tops in far north Queensland, Australia. It has narrow, cylindrical pseudobulbs, each with up to three thin, dark green leaves and usually only one or two white to cream-coloured flowers with yellow and purple markings near the centre.

Description
The side lobes are upright and triangular and the middle lobe is rounded with a central ridge and tangled hairs along its edges. Flowering occurs between November and January.

Taxonomy and naming
Dendrobium finniganense was first formally described in 1992 by David Jones and the description was published in Phytologia. The specific epithet (finniganense) is a reference to the type locality, Mount Finnigan.

Distribution and habitat
The Mount Finnigan cane orchid grows in exposed places often between boulders or Lomandra tussocks near the summits of Mount Finnigan, Mount Pieter Botte and Thornton Peak.

References 

finniganense
Endemic orchids of Australia
Orchids of Queensland
Plants described in 1992